Primal Fear is the debut studio album by the German power metal band Primal Fear, released in 1998.

Track listing

Additional information
The album was re-issued in 2005 by Nuclear Blast in a multibox containing the 1999 album Jaws of Death

Personnel
Band members
 Ralf Scheepers – vocals
 Tom Naumann – guitars, keyboards
 Mat Sinner – bass guitar, keyboards, backing vocals
 Klaus Sperling – drums

Additional musicians
Kai Hansen – lead guitars on "Formula One", "Dollars" and "Speedking"
Frank Roessler – keyboards (additional)

Production
Stephan Lohrmann – Cover art
Mat Sinner – Producer
Achim "Akeem" Köhler – Engineering
Tom Naumann – Co-Producer
Ralf Scheepers – Co-Producer
Rainer Ill – Photography
H. P. Pietschmann – Art direction

References

1998 debut albums
Primal Fear (band) albums
Nuclear Blast albums